The Tecopa Lake Beds is a Blancan Pleistocene geologic formation in the Mojave Desert in eastern California. It is in the Tecopa area, east of Death Valley, in southeastern Inyo and northeastern San Bernardino County.

The Lake Tecopa lake beds are the dry lake remnant of the formerly huge Pleistocene age Lake Tecopa, in the present day Amargosa River basin. It preserves fossils of the Quaternary period in the Cenozoic Era.

Among the fossils found in the Tecopa Lake Beds is Capricamelus gettyi, a camelid.

See also

 Lake Manly
 List of fossiliferous stratigraphic units in California
 
 Paleontology in California

References

Amargosa Desert
Endorheic lakes of California
Lakes of the Mojave Desert
Geology of Inyo County, California
Geology of San Bernardino County, California
Geologic formations of California
Natural history of the Mojave Desert
Pleistocene California